Act-On Software is a software-as-a-service product for marketing automation for small, midsize and enterprise businesses. Act-On is headquartered in Portland, Oregon and was founded in 2008, originally retailing its software exclusively through Cisco, which provided $2 million in funding. 

Act-On developed an internal sales department to market the software directly to users with $74 million in funding raised. Act-On has received positive customer reviews due to the software's ease of use and cost.

History
Act-On was founded in 2008 by Raghu Raghavan, formerly a founder of Responsys, after he saw "potential for a sophisticated, but affordable SaaS marketing tool mid-market companies could easily use." Act-On initially sold through alternate channels, but later created its own sales team. Entering the market after several competitors had been established, Act-On had a second-mover advantage, learning from the success and failures of earlier market entrants. Raghavan commented in a 2013 interview, "We came in, we saw all the things that had not been done right in this space, and I think it allowed us to build a company in a whole new way to attack what we saw in the monsters' market."

In 2009, the company's investors tried to convince founder Raghu Raghavan to move Act-On to Silicon Valley, but the company remained in Oregon. Act-On raised a second round of funding for $4 million in November 2010
 and a third round for $10 million in June 2011. In March 2011, Act-On re-launched its software with a new user interface. Later that year, Act-On expanded into larger offices in Beaverton, Oregon, Roseville, California and also established a new location in Silicon Valley. An additional $16 million in funding was raised the following year.

By 2013, the company had 140 employees, up from 11 in 2010 and 35 in 2011. In early 2016, it expanded again into larger offices in Portland.

In April 2014, $42 million in additional funding was raised, which was the largest funding round in the Oregon technology market since the dot com bubble. Act-On now employs about 200 people across the US and UK, serving more than 4,000 customers worldwide. In 2015, Act-On expanded its executive team with a new CFO, formerly of the company Jive, a VP of demand generation, previously with ExactTarget, and a VP of cloud operations.

In June 2020, Act-On Software rebranded itself to fit the modern marketing tool needs, prioritizing engagement, updates on services, and product inventory.

Features

Act-On is a subscription-based software-as-a-service (SaaS) product for marketing automation. Its software products are for email marketing, landing pages, social media prospecting, CRM integration, lead management, webinar management, and analytics.

Act-On has a Twitter Prospector tool introduced in 2010 that automates the publishing and monitoring of content on Twitter, tracking prospective customers and measuring their activity. An Act-On Insight tool, released in June 2012, compares a company's social media marketing performance to competitors. Its Hot Prospects tool, introduced at the 2011 Dreamforce conference, creates a dashboard in Salesforce.com that scores the likelihood a prospect is ready to make a purchasing decision. A set of software tools for search engine optimization, pay-per-click advertising and other inbound tactics was introduced in May 2013 under the name Act-On Inbound. Act-On also introduced a mobile app and mobile optimization features. In July 2014, Act-On announced a set of product updates intended to improve data visualization and customize the user experience. Enhancements included a responsive email composer and expanded CRM integrations.

In March 2015, It introduced Act-On Anywhere, a Chrome application allowing users access to marketing automation data and functionalities across any web-based browser. Allowing users to embed calls-to-action in web pages and blogs from any web-based content management system, this extension along with Act-On's open APIs, supports a larger vision for an open marketing ecosystem, in which third-party applications can plug and play with Act-On – ensuring that end-users can continue to leverage their current systems and augment the use of those systems using engagement data collected within marketing automation.

In June 2015, Act-On released Data Studio, an advanced data access and analytics tool allowing users to visualize, select, configure and export Act-On data to any Business Intelligence (BI) platform. Offered as part of Act-On's enterprise package, the feature equips users with built-in wizards, filters and templates to extract and report on engagement data in real-time.

Act-On is intended for marketing departments across small, midsize and enterprise companies, serving as a lower-cost and more customer-service focused alternative to enterprise software suites.

Users can manage WebEx and GoToWebinar events within the software. It also integrates with data and analytics services, such as Google Analytics. More connectors are available for Microsoft Dynamics, WordPress, Salesforce, SugarCRM, Oktopost and others.

As part of its Open Marketing Ecosystem, the Act-On platform offers native integrations with all major CRM systems, to be vendor-agnostic without being indifferent. A separate version for agencies has an agency dashboard to centrally manage multiple client campaigns and is sold at a lower bulk price. Act-On also promotes its agency partners and third-party applications on the Act-On Partner Exchange (APEX), manages an educational resource called the Act-On Center of Excellence (ACE) and provides professional services.

Reception
The company was named to the Inc. 500 List of Fastest-Growing Privately Held Companies in 2013, 2014 and 2015, Deloitte's Technology Fast 500 List in 2013 and 2014, and Portland Business Journal's List of 100 Fastest-Growing Private Companies in 2013, 2014, and 2015. 

In 2022, Constellation ShortList™ selected Act-On as one of the ten top vendors on the B2C Marketing Automation for Small to Mid Sized Business list, ranked alongside multiple enterprise-level competitors. This followed selection of 2021 for both the B2C Marketing Automation and B2B Marketing Automation Constellation lists.

In early 2015, the Portland Business Journal anointed Act-On's CEO Raghu Raghavan the Technology CEO of the Year, for his ability to manage the company's growth across multiple offices and continents.

Act-On published the results of a three-month survey, detailing differences between top and average performing B2B companies. The report found that few marketers owned the customer lifecycle "end to end," and top-performers were likelier to focus on customer retention and expansion, rather than their mid-size, average-performing peers. For its efforts promoting this report, Act-On was shortlisted for MarketingProfs' 2015 B2B Bright Bulb Awards.

In the 2014 Forrester Wave Report on Lead-to-Revenue Management Vendors, Act-On was ranked a leader in both categories: Small Marketing Teams and Large Enterprises. Forrester noted that Act-On did an admirable job delivering functionality for "nearly every criterion" evaluated: Simplicity, feature set, software and support. In Gleanster's Gleansight 2014 benchmark, Act-On received a "Best" ranking in three out of four categories: Ease of deployment, ease of use and overall value. In the 2014 VEST report from analyst firm Raab Associates, Act-On was awarded "good scores" on the "product and vendor dimensions," numbering among "strong leaders" in the "crowded small-to-midsize company segment." The 2015 VEST report named Act-On as "the only privately held company to rank as a leader across all major categories of business."

References

External links
 Official website
 HA Advantage case study by Target Marketing

Software companies based in Oregon
Companies based in Portland, Oregon
American companies established in 2008
Software companies of the United States
2008 establishments in Oregon
Software companies established in 2008